The Clean was a New Zealand indie rock band that formed in Dunedin in 1978. They have been described as the most influential band to come from the Flying Nun label, which recorded many artists associated with the "Dunedin sound".

Led through a number of early rotating line-ups by brothers Hamish and David Kilgour, the band settled on their well-known and current line-up with bassist Robert Scott. The band name comes from a character from the movie Free Ride called Mr. Clean.

History
Hamish and David Kilgour started to play and write music together in Dunedin in 1978, "building up a fat songbook of primitive punk, minimalist pop, infectious folk rock, and adventurous psychedelic instrumentals. Their sound was built around David Kilgour's off-centre, 1960s-influenced guitar, Hamish's motorik drumming, and melodic driving bass, first from Peter Gutteridge, then Robert Scott". The band's 1981 debut single "Tally Ho!" was the second release on Roger Shepherd's Flying Nun Records label. "Tally Ho!" reached number 19 on the New Zealand Singles Chart, giving the fledgling label its first hit.

Even with the group in abeyance The Odditties compilation tape of unreleased material appeared in July 1983, followed by a live EP, Live Dead Clean, in 1986, and a greatest hits collection called Compilation and second Odditties tape in 1988.

For most of the 1980s, The Clean were disbanded; during this time, the Kilgour brothers worked together on an experimental album and EP with the deliberately punny titles "The Great Unwashed" and "Clean Out of Our Minds".

In 1989 and 1990, the Clean toured New Zealand, the United States, and Britain and the rest of Europe to promote their album Vehicle.

In 1995, Flying Nun released Abbasalutely, an Abba tribute compilation. David Kilgour and Robert Scott recorded Waterloo under the band name Cloth, which the liner notes describe as "the Clean minus Hamish".

In 2003, the two-disc compilation Anthology, released on Merge Records, awakened new interest in the band in the US, building on an international reputation that had been enhanced by endorsements from prominent 1990s indie groups such as Pavement and Yo La Tengo.

The band released records on US and New Zealand labels—their most recent album being Mister Pop in 2009. They toured the US in 2012 and 2014.

Hamish Kilgour's death was announced on 6 December 2022, days after his family reporting him missing.

Discography

Vehicle (1990)
Modern Rock (1994)
Unknown Country (1996)
Getaway (2001)
Mister Pop (2009)

Awards

Aotearoa Music Awards
The Aotearoa Music Awards (previously known as New Zealand Music Awards (NZMA)) are an annual awards night celebrating excellence in New Zealand music and have been presented annually since 1965.

! 
|-
| 2017 || The Clean || New Zealand Music Hall of Fame ||  || 
|-

Filmography
1999: Scarfies, in which they are seen performing the song "Tally Ho!" in a performance at the Empire Tavern, Dunedin (the line-up for this performance was David Kilgour, Robert Scott, Robbie Yeats, and Thomas Bell). The song appeared on the soundtrack.

References

External links
Interview at Acetone Magazine
The Clean on Flying Nun Records 
The Clean on Film Archive
 

New Zealand indie rock groups
Flying Nun Records artists
Musical groups established in 1978
Dunedin Sound musical groups
Jangle pop groups
Sibling musical groups
Merge Records artists
1978 establishments in New Zealand